A Gentle Creature is a 1960 Soviet drama film directed by Aleksandr Borisov. A screen adaptation of the story of the same name by Dostoevsky.

Plot 
From lack of money, a girl without a dowry marries a usurer. But later he learns about her husband's past: about the circumstances under which he left the regiment. The meek one tries to rebel against life with her despised husband.

Cast 
 Iya Savvina as Gentle Woman
 Andrei Popov as Pawnbroker
 Vera Kuznetsova as Lukerya
 Panteleymon Krymov as Officer Yefimovich (as Pantelejmon Krymov)
 Zinaida Dorogova as episode
 Aleksandr Gustavson as Officer
 Nikolai Kryukov as Lieutenant
 Georgiy Kurovskiy as Officer

References

External links 
 

1960 films
1960s Russian-language films
Soviet drama films
1960 drama films
Films based on works by Fyodor Dostoyevsky
Soviet black-and-white films
Lenfilm films